Cathrine Helene Kraayeveld (born September 30, 1981) is an American former professional basketball player who played in the WNBA. Her father, Dave, played football for the Seattle Seahawks in 1978.

High school and college

Cathrine attended Lake Washington High School in Kirkland, Washington and Bellevue Christian High School in Bellevue, Washington.  Catherine attended and played for the University of Oregon. She majored in Human and Family Services.

Oregon statistics
Source

WNBA career
Cathrine was drafted in the third round, then cut by the San Antonio Silver Stars in 2005. Midway through the 2005 season she was picked up by the New York Liberty.  She was traded in 2010 to the Sky as part of a three-team trade.

In 2007 Cathrine finished 8th in the league with a .411 3-point FG percentage.

References

External links
WNBA Profile
WNBA Rookie Profile

1981 births
Living people
American women's basketball players
Basketball players from Washington (state)
Chicago Sky players
New York Liberty players
Atlanta Dream players
San Antonio Stars players
Oregon Ducks women's basketball players
Small forwards
Sportspeople from Kirkland, Washington